Philipp Hansa (born 3 June 1990) is an Austrian radio presenter and actor.

He has been in films like Das Fest der Liebe (2012). After graduating in 2011, Hansa started working for the radio station HITRADIO Ö3, he has been both a radio presenter on the radio station as well as an actor in radio plays as the character Hansmann. Since February 2015 Hansa is presenting the morning show on the station.

Hansa presented the jury votes from Austria in the 2019, 2021, and 2022 Eurovision Song Contest finals.

References

Living people
1990 births
Austrian radio presenters
Actors from Graz
ORF (broadcaster) people
Mass media people from Graz